Perfluoropolyether (PFPE) is a type of liquid lubricant that has been used in the aerospace industry for over 30 years.

Perfluoropolyether consists of a polymer chain in which monomers consisting of perfluoro-alkyl groups are joined by ether linkages. The bonds between carbon and oxygen or fluorine are strong.

The thermal and chemical stability of PFPE along with a vapor–liquid equilibrium of 230 °C when mixed with the right composites make it a suitable candidate for vapor phase soldering technologies.

History 
It's been developed in early 1960s at request of USAF with a requirement to be non-reacting with liquid and gaseous oxygen (O2).

Manufacture
Perfluoropolyether can be synthesized from tetrafluoroethylene or hexafluoropropylene.

Properties
PFPE is chemically inert to many acids and oxidants (like fuming sulfuric acid (oleum, SO3), chlorine gas, oxygen) and solvents, etc..

PFPE is non-toxic under normal conditions, nonflammable, and exhibit unusually high load carry capabilities.
PFPE can withstand gamma ray degradation.

Electrical resistivity is 1014 ohm/cm

Applications 
Generally PFPE may be used as lubricant in all sorts of bearing, plug valves, gaskets, chains, and joint bearing applications, where oxygen inertness of a material is a requirement. Examples include aircraft fuel systems, mechanical components of devices used in airspace, deep space or high vacuum and at cryogenic temperatures.

PFPE may be used in mold release agent for plastic injection molding.

As top coating lubricant on computer disc drives and Scanning Electron Microscope

As anti-galling compounds.

As fluid medium in ferrofluidic seals.

Semiconductor industry 
In the semiconductor industry, PFPE may be used as a vacuum grease or in plasma etching equipment, or for robots used in semiconductor wafer handling, clean rooms, and other commercial environments.

See also 

 Krytox, a PFPE-based lubricant

References

Lubricants